Nyctimenius ochraceovittatus is a species of beetle in the family Cerambycidae. It was described by Per Olof Christopher Aurivillius in 1922, originally under the genus Nyctimene. It is known from Borneo, Malaysia and the Philippines.

References

Lamiinae
Beetles described in 1922